The Indigenous Team of the Century (Australian rules football) was selected to recognise the role of Indigenous Australians in the sport. It was announced in 2005 to celebrate the 100th anniversary of the first senior-level game played by an indigenous player in the Victorian/Australian Football League, Fitzroy's Joe Johnson.

The panel's final selection from a shortlist of 35 consisted of 24 players, 19 of whom have represented clubs competing in the Victorian/Australian Football League, whilst the remaining five were picked for their record in either the South Australian National Football League or the West Australian Football League.

Graham Farmer was named as the team's captain, while Barry Cable was selected as the team's coach.  Eight of the players were still active in the AFL at the time of being selected.

The Team

An umpire, Glenn James, was also selected.

The selection panel
The Indigenous Team of the Century selection panel consisted of:
 Patrick Dodson (AFL Indigenous Foundation board member)
 Ernie Dingo (media personality)
 Glenn James (former umpire)
 Kevin Sheedy (Essendon Football Club coach)
 Kevin Sheehan (AFL national talent manager)
 Mike Sheahan (journalist)
 Michelangelo Rucci (journalist)
 Col Hutchinson (AFL historian)

Similar teams
The AFL announced its Team of the Century in 1996, which also featured Graham Farmer in the lead ruck position.  Other ethnic based teams such as the Greek Team of the Century and Italian Team of the Century have also been announced. Many individual clubs have also named teams of the century, with South Fremantle Football Club announcing their own Indigenous Team of the Century in July 2009.  The National Rugby League announced their Indigenous Team of the Century in 2008.

See also

 Dreamtime at the 'G
 Indigenous All-Stars (Australian rules football)

References

Australian Football League awards
Australian rules football awards
Australian rules football representative teams
 
Indigenous Australian sport